Patrick "Pat" Brazil  (born 1930) is a former senior Australian public servant. His career included time serving as the head of the Attorney-General's Department between 1983 and 1989.

Life and career
Pat Brazil was born in Fortitude Valley, Queensland in 1930. He was educated in Ipswich at a convent school, and later at the Christian Brothers College. He won a scholarship to study Arts and Law at the University of Queensland.

Brazil moved to Canberra to join the Attorney-General's Department in August 1953.

Between 1983 and 1989, Brazil was Secretary of the Attorney-General's Department. When he resigned from the role, he also resigned from the Australian Public Service.

Awards
Brazil was made an Officer of the Order of Australia in June 1989, in recognition of service to the Public Service as Secretary of the Attorney-General's Department.

References

1930 births
Living people
Australian public servants
Officers of the Order of Australia